Jhantipahari (also written as Jhanti Pahari) is a census town in the Chhatna CD block in the Bankura Sadar subdivision of the Bankura district in the state of West Bengal, India.

Geography

Location

Area overview
The map alongside shows the Bankura Sadar subdivision of Bankura district. Physiographically, this area is part of the Bankura Uplands in the west gradually merging with the Bankura-Bishnupur Rarh Plains in the north-east. The western portions are characterised by undulating terrain with many hills and ridges. The area is having a gradual descent from the Chota Nagpur Plateau. The soil is laterite red and hard beds are covered with scrub jungle and sal wood. Gradually it gives way to just uneven rolling lands but the soil continues to be lateritic. There are coal mines in the northern part, along the Damodar River. It is a predominantly rural area with 89% of the population living in rural areas and only 11% living in the urban areas.

Note: The map alongside presents some of the notable locations in the subdivision. All places marked in the map are linked in the larger full screen map.

Demographics
According to the 2011 Census of India, Jhanti Pahari had a total population of 5,326, of which 2,726 (51%) were males and 2,600 (49%) were females. There were 562 persons in the age range of 0–6 years. The total number of literate persons in Jhanti Pahari was 3,682 (77.29% of the population over 6 years).

.*For language details see Chhatna (community development block)#Language and religion

Infrastructure
According to the District Census Handbook 2011, Bankura, Jhanti Pahari covered an area of 3.8876 km2. Among the civic amenities, it had 6 km roads with both open and covered drains, the protected water supply involved tap water from treated sources, tubewell/ borehole. It had 763 domestic electric connections. Among the medical facilities it had 1 dispensary/ health centre, 1 nursing home, 1 charitable hospital/ nursery, 2 medicine shops. Among the educational facilities it had were 3 primary schools, 1 middle school, 1 secondary school, 1 senior secondary school, the nearest general degree college at Bankura 23 km away. Among the social cultural and recreational facilities, it had 1 cinema theatre, 1 public library, 1 reading room. Three important commodities it produced were rice, mustard oil, flour. It had the branch offices of 1 private commercial bank and 1 non-agricultural credit society.

It had 7 sports ground, 11 temples. Else there are 1 Police Phari, 10 mils, 1 cement factory, 4 Poltry firms, 2 fish-veri, 2 Clothing & 2 Grocery Retail outlet along with more than 70 shops, 5 dhaba hotel, 6 Sweet shops.  It had the branch offices of 1 private commercial bank, ATM, tathya seva kendra, 1 gramin bank and 1 non-agricultural credit society. The Jhatipahari high school had achieved a Madhyamik board-stand record of 9th position in 2006.

Economy
This village has very large contribution as Rice mill, Mustard Oil mill, Fish & various vegetables cultivation, Poltry firm factory inside the district. Once there were ongoing approx 21 Mills at a high level of production that is being supplied across bankura and some neighbour districts during 1990 - 2008. One of the popular mill is Kamal rice mill and popular item that the village produced here is Hiramoti oil. Currently this village has well developed in some essential aspects like Education, Banking and finance, Cultivation, Transport.

Transport
Jhantipahari railway station is on the Kharagpur-Bankura-Adra line of South Eastern Railway.

Jhantipahari Bus stand that connects Bankura-Raniganj-Saotaldihi, Bankura-Kashipur, Bankura-Kampalpur-Purulia regions.
A huge commercial commuters used for an Iron Factory situated nearby in Jorhira for transporting Iron Raw materials via rail station to factory warehouse. Private taxies, auto rickshaws, hand rickshaws are available to make public transport more suitable across the village.

Education
Jhantipahari High School is a Bengali-medium coeducational institution established in 1945. It has facilities for teaching from class V to class XII. The school has 12 computers, a library with 500 books and a playground.

Healthcare
There is a primary health centre at Jhantipahari.

References

Cities and towns in Bankura district